Thomas Stock (1750–1803) established the first Sunday school in the United Kingdom.

Early life and education
Thomas was the son of Thomas Stock, gentleman of Gloucester. The young Thomas joined Pembroke College, Oxford from John Roysse's Free School in Abingdon-on-Thames (now Abingdon School).

Career
Entering Holy Orders, Stock was curate at Ashbury in Berkshire (now Oxfordshire), where he formed the first Sunday school in the country in 1777. Stock became rector of St Aldate's and then of St John Baptist's, Gloucester and headmaster of Gloucester Free School. He was also vicar of Glasbury-on-Wye. At Gloucester, jointly with Robert Raikes, proprietor of the Gloucester Journal, Stock became co-founder of the Sunday School movement.

There are memorials to Stock at Ashbury parish church and in the nave of Gloucester Cathedral. He was author of A Compendious Grammar of the Greek Language (1780). There is also a residential cul-de-sac, Thomas Stock Gardens, built in 1994–5 in the Abbeymead area of Gloucester on the western outskirts of Gloucester.

See also
 List of Old Abingdonians

References

English Anglicans
Alumni of Pembroke College, Oxford
People educated at Abingdon School
People from Vale of White Horse (district)
1750 births
1803 deaths